Ossetia (or ,   or , ; ; , translit. Oseti) is an ethnolinguistic region located on both sides of the Greater Caucasus Mountains, largely inhabited by the Ossetians. The Ossetian language is part of the Eastern Iranian branch of the family of Indo-European languages. Most countries recognize the Ossetian-speaking area south of the main Caucasus ridge as lying within the borders of Georgia, but it has come under the control of the de facto government of the Russian-backed Republic of South Ossetia – the State of Alania. The northern portion of the region consists of the Republic of North Ossetia-Alania within the Russian Federation.

Recent history

 1774 – Expansion of the Russian Empire on Ossetian territory.
 1922 – Creation of the South Ossetian autonomous oblast. North Ossetia remains a part of Russian SFSR, South Ossetia remains a part of Georgian SSR.
 20 September 1990 – South Ossetia declares independence. The republic remained unrecognized, yet it detached itself from Georgia de facto. In the last years of the Soviet Union, ethnic tensions between Ossetians and Georgians in Georgia's former Autonomous Oblast of South Ossetia (abolished in 1990) and between Ossetians and the Ingush in North Ossetia evolved into violent clashes that left several hundred dead and wounded and created a large tide of refugees on both sides.

Although a Russian-mediated and Organization for Security and Co-operation in Europe-monitored ceasefire was implemented in South Ossetia in 1992, the Georgian-Ossetian conflict still remains unresolved even though a recent peace plan proposed by the government of Georgia promised the South Ossetians larger autonomy and pledged expanded international involvement in the political settlement of the conflict. Meanwhile, the South Ossetian secessionist authorities demand independence or unification with North Ossetia, which itself is located in Russia, while the international community instead recognizes it and Abkhazia as a part of Georgia.

On Sunday 12 November 2006, South Ossetians (mostly ethnic Ossetians) went to the polls to vote in a referendum regarding the region's independence from Georgia. The result was a "yes" to independence, with a turnout above 95% from those among the territory's 70,000 people who were eligible to vote at that time. There was also a vote in favor of a new term for Eduard Kokoity, who was the de facto state's president at the time.

There have been proposals from South Ossetia for joining the Russian Federation and uniting with North Ossetia.

See also
 History of North Ossetia–Alania
 Alania
 Vladimir Gagloyev
 Jászság
 Alexander Kubalov
 Samachablo
 Circassia
 Iazyges
 Adygea

References

External links

  (6 min 19 sec).
  (6 min 50 sec).
  (3 min).
 .  Ossetian Republic News Portal.

 

Divided regions
Geography of Georgia (country)
Geography of Russia
Historical regions